The Arriflex 16SR is a motion picture camera product line created by Arri, introduced in 1975. This 16SR camera series is designed for 16 mm filmmaking in Standard 16 format. 'SR' Stands for Silent Reflex.

In 1982, Arri released the 16SR2, for improved function over the previous version, e.g. lower operational noise level.

In 1992, Arri released the 16SR3, the latest and the only series that can support the Super 16 format in the 16SR series without modification to the Super 16 format. It appeared in two versions: "Advanced" & "HS" (High Speed), for high speed filming.

The 16 SR series of cameras are distinguished by their small portable profile, their multidirectional viewfinder having a correctly upright picture in all positions, to the right and to the left of the camera, a crystal controlled motor and a quick-change 400 ft coaxial magazine. A 200 ft coaxial magazine was originally featured in the photo of the 16 SR in an  Arri collective brochure in 1975, but this was only a prototype and was never marketed. The small 180 degree single-blade "half moon" mirror shutter always stops in the closed position (other Arri 16mm cameras, the 16 BL, 16M and 16 ST have twin-blade mirror shutters which stop randomly and have to be inched). Early 16 SR cameras were not exceptionally quiet, about 30 dB(A) one meter from the lens, but improvements rendered later cameras very quiet. The Arri 16 SR line was superseded by the Arriflex 416 line in 2006.

 Introduced in 1975.
 Arri bayonet lens mount.

Arriflex 16SR2
 
 Introduced in 1982.
 Arri bayonet lens mount in early models.
 PL lens mount in later models.
 Arri Precision Exposure Control (APEC) was added, which detects camera speed automatically.

Arriflex 16SR2-E
In 1982 Arri introduced the 16SR2-E (Economic), as a cheaper alternative to the SR2. For comparison, at its release the SR2 cost approx 24K $, while the 16SR-E cost 21K $.

Arriflex 16SR3
 
 Introduced in 1992.
 Adding support of Super 16 format.
 PL lens mount.

Advanced
 Running speed: 5 to 75 frame/s

HS (High Speed)
 Running Speed: 5 to 150 frame/s

Motion pictures
She's Gotta Have It (1986) – A film by Spike Lee

Clerks (1994) – A film by Kevin Smith

Closer to Home (1995) – A film by Joseph Nobile

The Castle (1997) – A film by Rob Sitch

Japón (2002) - A film by Carlos Reygadas

The Squid and the Whale (2005) – A film by Noah Baumbach

Uncle Boonmee Who Can Recall His Past Lives (2010) – A film by Apichatpong Weerasethakul

Black Swan (2010) – A film by Darren Aronofsky

Red Rocket (2021) – A film by Sean Baker

Television
Lizzie McGuire (2001-2004) – A Disney series created by Terri Minsky

The O.C. (2003-2007) – A Warner Bros. series created by Josh Schwartz

See also
 Arriflex 416, Arri's next generation's 16 mm camera system series.

References

External links
 Official Site of Arriflex 16SR Series

Movie cameras